Jessie Mary Grey, Lady Street (née Lillingston; 18 April 1889 – 2 July 1970) was an Australian diplomat, suffragette and campaigner for Indigenous Australian rights, dubbed "Red Jessie" by the media. As Australia's only female delegate to the founding of the United Nations in 1945, Jessie was Australia's first female delegate to the United Nations, where she ensured the inclusion of gender as a non-discrimination clause in the United Nations Charter. She was Lady Street by her husband, Sir Kenneth Whistler Street.

Background

Jessie Mary Grey Lillingston was born on 18 April 1889 at Ranchi, Bihar, India. Her father Charles Alfred Gordon Lillingston,   (great-grandson of Sir George Grey, 1st Baronet) was a member of the Imperial Civil Service in India. Her mother Mabel Harriet Ogilvie was the daughter of Australian politician Edward David Stuart Ogilvie. In 1916, she married Kenneth Whistler Street, giving her the title of Lady Street. Her father-in-law Sir Philip Whistler Street served as Chief Justice of New South Wales, as did her husband Sir Kenneth and their youngest son, Sir Laurence. Their other children were Belinda, Philippa and Roger. She graduated from the University of Sydney in 1911 as a Bachelor of Arts.

Career and activism
Street was a prominent figure in Australian and international political life for over 50 years, from the women's suffrage movement in England to the Aboriginal Australian rights. Street ran in the 1943 Australian federal election as a member of the Australian Labor Party against United Australia Party frontbencher Eric Harrison for the Sydney Eastern Suburbs seat of Wentworth, and nearly defeated him amid that year's massive Labor landslide. She led the field on the first count, and only the preferences of conservative independent Bill Wentworth allowed Harrison to survive. Her attempt was the closest a Labor candidate has ever come to winning the conservative stronghold of Wentworth.

At the San Francisco Conference in 1945, Street was Australia's only female delegate to the founding of the United Nations, where she played a key role alongside Eleanor Roosevelt in ensuring that gender was included with race and religion as a non-discrimination clause in the United Nations Charter. In 1949, Street was made a charter member of the Australian Peace Council. The Jessie Street Centre, the Jessie Street Trust, the Jessie Street National Women's Library and Jessie Street Gardens exist in her honour.

References

Bibliography
 Red Jessie: Jessie Street  – biography produced by the National Archives of Australia.
 Street, Jessie Mary Grey  – The Encyclopedia of Women and Leadership in Twentieth-Century Australia
 Jessie Street | Australian Women  –  Australian Women's Archives Project.
 Jessie Street Papers | National Library of Australia  – National Library of Australia.
 Jessie Street | Australian Broadcasting Corporation  – Australian Broadcasting Corporation (ABC) profile.

Further reading 
Lenore Coltheart, "Jessie Street and the Soviet Union", in Political Tourists: Travellers from Australia to the Soviet Union in the 1920s–1940s. Eds. Sheila Fitzpatrick and Carolyn Rasmussen. Melbourne University Press, 2008.  
Heather Radi,  Jessie Street, Documents and Essays, Women's Redress Press, 1990. 
Peter Sekuless,  Jessie Street, a rewarding but unrewarded life, Prentice Hall, 1978. 
Jessie Street, ed Lenore Coltheart,  Jessie Street, a Revised Autobiography, Federation Press, 2004.  
Jessie Street,  Truth or Repose, Australasian Book Society, 1966.
Eric Russell, Woollahra – a History in Pictures, John Ferguson Pty Ltd., 1980.

External links 
 Red Jessie: Jessie Street – biography produced by the National Archives of Australia.
 
 
 Jessie Street Papers | National Library of Australia National Library of Australia.
 Jessie Street | Australian Broadcasting Corporation ABC broadcast on Jessie Street.

1889 births
1970 deaths
Australian suffragists
Australian indigenous rights activists
Women human rights activists
Australian women's rights activists
University of Sydney alumni
People from Ranchi
Jessie
19th-century Australian women
20th-century Australian women
Australian pacifists
British people in colonial India
British emigrants to Australia